Daniel P. Seaton was a doctor, African Methodist Episcopalian (A.M.E.) minister, and author. He traveled to the Middle East and wrote The land of promise or The Bible land and its revelation. It was illustrated with  engravings of "some of the most important places in Palestine and Syria" and published in Philadelphia, Pennsylvania by the Publishing House of the A.M.E. Church in 1895. The book advocated for the conversion of Jews to Christianity and their return to Palestine.

Seaton was born in 1835 in Reisterstown, Maryland.

His home in the Lincoln area outside of Washington D.C was designed by African American architect Isaiah Hatton. Seaton established a church in the community and served as a doctor. He was a member of the Good Samaritans.

The Seaton Memorial African Methodist Episcopalian Church in Lincoln Park, Rockville, Maryland is named for him.

See also
Zionism
Christian Zionism

References

1935 births
Living people